The Northern Region  is one of four regions in the country of Uganda.

Districts 
As of 2010, the Northern Region had 30 districts:

References

External links 

 Google Map of the Northern Region of Uganda

 
Regions of Uganda